Linton is a village and civil parish in Cambridgeshire, England, on the border with Essex. The A1307 passes through the village.

The civil parish population at the 2011 Census was 4,525.

History
The 1086 Domesday Book records Linton as "Lintone", with 27 households and two mills.

The village has expanded since the 1960s and is now a dormitory village of Cambridge.

The railway station was on the Stour Valley Railway between Shelford and Colchester, closed since 1967.

The Wacky Races was a local annual event that occurred from 2002 to 2006 on the second Bank Holiday Weekend in May. It began on the extended Bank Holiday Weekend, which commemorated Queen Elizabeth II's 50th coronation anniversary, and raised money for local charities. Participants would race in comedic, homemade costumes and carts down the High Street, with one team mate stopping in each pub to have a pint, and then racing through the fields next to the village and back down the High Street, again drinking in the pubs. Along the course, firemen, from Linton Fire Station, would spray water at the racers, as well as spectators utilising water pistols and water bombs.

The parish includes the deserted village of Barham.

Landmarks
St Mary's Anglican Church is more properly known by its dedication to the Blessed Virgin Mary and is therefore the Parish Church of St Mary-the-Virgin serving the whole ecclesiastical parish of Linton. It has been established here on the banks of the River Granta for more than 800 years. The six bells of St Mary's were renovated in 2005. St Mary's bellringers are associated with the Ely Diocesan Association of Church Bell Ringers.

Linton House (64 High Street) is a Grade II* listed building. An L-shaped building, it was originally two houses, the later, built by John Lone dating from about 1690. The west doorcase is said to have been reclaimed from Catley Park.

Linton Zoo is on the southern edge of Linton village. At the north side of the parish is Chilford Hall and its vineyards. 

On Rivey Lane at Rivey Hill is  Linton Water Tower. The River Granta, a chalk stream, runs through the village. There are around 200 chalk streams, most of which are in England.The fish Brookes Lamprey has been seen in the River Granta at Leadwell Meadows.

Linton village is on the Icknield Way Path, 110-mile route from Ivinghoe Beacon in Buckinghamshire to Knettishall Heath in Suffolk. The Icknield Way Trail, a route used by walkers, horse riders and off-road cyclists, also passes through the village.

The author Graham Greene's wife once owned The Queens House in Linton. His wife Vivien bought the house in 1947 but sold the house in 1948. The house is on High Street, opposite The Crown public house, one of three public houses in the village.

There is a trading estate at The Grip.

Education
There are four schools in Linton. Linton CE Infant School is a school in the middle of the village, adjacent to St Mary's church, teaching children aged 4 to 7. At the end of the village facing Balsham, on Wheatsheaf Way, is Linton Heights Junior School, a primary school which teaches children from ages 7 to 11. Linton Village College is on the A1307, the main Haverhill-to-Cambridge road, and teaches children aged 11 to 16, including those from surrounding villages. The Granta School, located next to Linton Village Collage, is one of Cambridgeshire's six area special schools, where pupils with special educational needs from the ages of 3 to 19 are taught.

Popular culture
Fictional character Alan Partridge stayed at the also fictional Linton Travel Tavern in I'm Alan Partridge, claiming that Linton is equidistant between London and Norwich. Linton is near the halfway point of the London-to-Norwich A11 trunk road, although some four miles from the actual road.  The actual location used for the BBC television series was the Hilton Hotel on the A41 near Bushey in south Hertfordshire.

See also
 Linton railway station, a disused station that once served the village
 List of places in Cambridgeshire
 The Hundred Parishes

External links

 Linton village web site
 2001 Census
 Linton Zoo

References 

 
Villages in Cambridgeshire
Civil parishes in Cambridgeshire
South Cambridgeshire District